Lepanthes guatemalensis is a species of orchid found from Mexico (Chiapas) to El Salvador.

References

External links 

guatemalensis
Flora of Central America
Flora of Belize
Orchids of Guatemala
Orchids of El Salvador
Orchids of Chiapas